The Church are an Australian rock band formed in Sydney in 1980. Initially associated with new wave, neo-psychedelia, and indie rock, their music later came to feature slower tempos and surreal soundscapes reminiscent of dream pop and post-rock. Glenn A. Baker has written that "From the release of the 'She Never Said' single in November 1980, this unique Sydney-originated entity has purveyed a distinctive, ethereal, psychedelic-tinged sound which has alternatively found favour and disfavour in Australia." The Los Angeles Times has described the band's music as "dense, shimmering, exquisite guitar pop".

The founding members were Steve Kilbey on lead vocals and bass guitar, Peter Koppes and Marty Willson-Piper on guitars, and Nick Ward on drums. Ward played only on their debut album, and the band's drummer for the rest of the 1980s was Richard Ploog. Jay Dee Daugherty (ex-Patti Smith Group) played drums from 1990 to 1993, followed by "timEbandit" Tim Powles (ex-The Venetians), who remains with them to the present day. Koppes left the band from 1992 to 1997,
and Willson-Piper left in 2013. Ian Haug, formerly of Powderfinger, replaced him. Kilbey, Koppes, and Powles also recorded together as the Refo:mation in 1997.

The Church's debut album, Of Skins and Heart (1981), delivered their first radio hit, "The Unguarded Moment", and they were signed to major labels in Australia, Europe, and the United States. However, the US label, dissatisfied with their second album, dropped the band without releasing it. This put a dent in their international success, but they returned to the charts in 1988 with the album  Starfish and the US Top 40 hit "Under the Milky Way". Subsequent mainstream success has proved elusive, but the band retains a large international cult following and were inducted into the ARIA Hall of Fame in Sydney in 2010. The Church continue to tour and record, releasing their 25th studio album, Man Woman Life Death Infinity, in October 2017.

History

1980–1981: Early days, Of Skins and Heart
Singer, songwriter, and bass guitarist Steve Kilbey first played with guitarist Peter Koppes in a glam rock band called Baby Grande in Canberra, Australia in the mid-1970s. After each had left to travel and play in other bands, including Tactics (Kilbey) and Limazine (Koppes), they met again in Sydney in March 1980 and formed the initial three-piece version of The Church, with Limazine drummer Nick Ward. The name was a shortened version of the original name proposed by Kilbey: "The Church of Man". A month later, Marty Willson-Piper, originally from Liverpool, United Kingdom, witnessed one of their gigs and met Kilbey afterwards. That same night he was invited to join the band on guitar, establishing the classic two-guitar formation.

A four-song demo was recorded in Kilbey's bedroom studio and sent, through contacts from his and Koppes's old band Baby Grande, to the Australian branch of the Beatles' publishing company, ATV Northern Songs. The song "Chrome Injury" attracted the attention of managing director Chris Gilbey, who signed the band to his recently formed record production company, in association with EMI and their recently resurrected Parlophone label. Gilbey went to band rehearsals and helped shape their sound—he bought Willson-Piper a 12-string Rickenbacker guitar and equipped Koppes with an Echolette tape delay. Of that first batch of demos, only "Chrome Injury" would go on to be recorded for release.

The band's debut album, Of Skins and Heart, was recorded late in 1980, produced by Gilbey and mixed by Bob Clearmountain. Seven of the nine tracks were written solely by Kilbey and two co-written with others. The first single, "She Never Said", was released in November, but did not chart. At the start of 1981, Ward was replaced on drums by Richard Ploog. Ploog was recruited by their manager, Michael Chugg, after hearing of his reputation in Adelaide. Ploog's arrival established The Church's first stable line-up. The second single, "The Unguarded Moment", co-written by Kilbey and Michelle Parker, was issued alongside the album in March 1981, but only in Australia initially. "The Unguarded Moment" became an Australian top forty hit, reaching No. 22 on the Australian Kent Music Report Singles Chart, while Of Skins and Heart went gold, achieving the same position on the related Albums Chart. To promote the releases, the band undertook their first national tour.

The first recordings with Ploog were released as a five-track double 7" EP, Too Fast for You, in July. It included the first collectively written track, "Sisters". Another track, "Tear It All Away", later released as a separate single, showed a development towards the more elaborate guitar structures which would become part of the band's signature sound. Their image and sound now evoked comparisons with 1960s psychedelic groups, with tight jeans, paisley shirts, and Byrds-style jangly guitars.

Of Skins and Hearts commercial success enabled Gilbey to present the release to Freddie Cannon of French label Carrere and Rupert Perry of U.S. label Capitol. Both labels released the album in 1982, renaming it simply The Church and slightly altering the track listing to include songs from Too Fast for You and using a crop of that EP's artwork as the cover. The Church peaked at No. 7 in the New Zealand Albums Chart and No. 13 in Sweden. Ploog was incorrectly credited as the sole drummer on the release, despite only playing on one or three tracks, depending on the version. Capitol also released an edited single version of "The Unguarded Moment", without the band's approval.

1982–1985: The Blurred Crusade, Seance, Remote Luxury, Persia
The band's second album, The Blurred Crusade, was issued in March 1982 and was both produced and mixed by Bob Clearmountain. Sonically and stylistically more complex than the debut, it is "a smoother, fuller release", which showed the clear influence of 1960s psychedelia. "With its mystical lyrics the second album ... brought the group's own style more into focus". The album peaked at No. 10 and its first single, "Almost with You" resulted in a second Top 30 hit, peaking at No. 21.

The Church undertook a second Australian tour, while Carrere released the album in Europe, generating enough sales for them to tour there in October. However, Capitol declined to release The Blurred Crusade in North America and demanded that they write more radio-friendly material, as exemplified by their stable-mates Little River Band, which horrified the band. After another recording session, five new songs were offered to Capitol but the label was still unimpressed and dropped the band. The five songs were later released in Australia as the EP  Sing-Songs, which reached the Top 100 Albums Chart in December. Meanwhile, their manager, Michael Chugg, arranged a U.K. tour supporting the hugely successful pop group Duran Duran, but after eight gigs The Church pulled out, feeling that audiences were unsympathetic. Chugg later recalled, "They were hard work. All four of them were strong-willed and had their own ideas of how things should be." The band also toured Scandinavia and Europe in 1982, and both of their albums were released there to critical acclaim.

In May 1983, the band released their third album, Seance, co-produced by The Church and engineer John Bee (Hoodoo Gurus, Icehouse, The Divinyls), which peaked at No. 18. It used more keyboards and synthesizers and was typically described as "That stark release [which] explored the band's darker side, and [whose] tracks ... were awash with strings and other effects". The accompanying live shows included a guest keyboardist, Melbourne-based session player Dean Walliss.

For Seance, the band employed mixing engineer Nick Launay, who had worked with Midnight Oil. He favoured a gated reverb drum sound, popular in the 1980s, which produced a staccato-like snare sound. Unsatisfied with this, the band asked Launay to redo the mix, but the effect was only lightened. The first single, "Electric Lash", featured this effect especially prominently and it was likened to a "machine gun". Despite dissatisfaction over the mix, Seance featured a lusher, more atmospheric sound with highlights including "Now I Wonder Why" and "Fly". Internationally, the album sold poorly, being considered dark and cryptic, and the general public seemed to lose interest. Some critics in Europe and the U.S. did like the album however, with Creem hailing the band as "one of the best in the world".

Seance was again dominated by Kilbey's songwriting. Some 20 songs were put together on his home 4-track. Only one band composition made the album: the experimental "Travel by Thought". Kilbey and Willson-Piper had co-written another track, "10,000 Miles", but the label rejected it. Kilbey was upset by the label's interference, finding the track essential to their live set (it would be included on their next EP). Despite the difficulties, the album yielded two minor hits - "It's No Reason" and "Electric Lash" - and stayed in the British independent charts for several months.

The group had built a devoted fan base with their paisley shirts, catchy melodies, and solid live performances. Following the release of Seance, they toured Australia and New Zealand for the rest of the year to pay off debts incurred on the European tour. Meanwhile, Capitol Records released their first album in Canada, where it reached the Top 20. The Sing-Songs EP also became one of the bestselling Canadian imports of 1983.

Forgoing a full album, the band released two EPs in 1984, Remote Luxury in March and Persia in August, but only in Australia and New Zealand. Both EPs reached the Top 50 on the Australian Albums Chart. Again, almost all tracks were written by Kilbey, but compared to Seance, the atmosphere was lighter and less gloomy. The band's trademark guitar sound was complemented by the keyboards of guest musicians Davey Ray Moor (from the Crystal Set, which included Kilbey's brother Russell) and Craig Hooper (from the Reels), who joined as an auxiliary member. Hooper soon left to form the Mullanes.

The band then signed to Warner Bros. Records in the United States. Internationally, the two EPs were repackaged as a single album titled Remote Luxury. Its U.S. release was their first record there since the debut album – although The Blurred Crusade and Seance had sold well on import. Due to the interest raised in the U.S., they left Michael Chugg Management in Sydney and signed with Malibu Management's owner John Lee. They toured the US in October and November and while venues in New York and Los Angeles saw audiences of about 1,000 people, other gigs had as few as 50. In financial terms, the tour went poorly and the band lost thousands of dollars a week.

The Church seemed to reach a nadir in 1984. Unable to repeat the commercial success of the first two albums, there was a perception that their creativity was declining. Kilbey later said: "I think we released a few dud records that weren't as good as they should have been, after The Blurred Crusade ... The band was just drifting along in a sea of apathy, I was writing not-so-good songs and the band wasn't playing them very well, so everyone's enthusiasm just waned".

The start of 1985 was quiet for the band as members spent time apart in Stockholm, Sydney, and Jamaica. Kilbey's debut solo single, "This Asphalt Eden", was released by EMI Parlophone and he was also the producer on the single "Benefit of the Doubt" for the Crystal Set.

1985–1988: Heyday, Starfish

The Church reconvened at Studios 301 in mid-1985 to work on their next album, Heyday, with British producer/engineer Peter Walsh (Simple Minds, Scott Walker, Peter Gabriel). Their first single in almost two years, "Already Yesterday", appeared in October and just made the Top 100. Heyday followed in November and brought new stylistic elements with the addition of real strings and horns, creating a warm, organic sound. The songs "were among the richest moments in The Church canon". While Kilbey still wrote the lyrics, the band were now largely writing the music together, a practice which they would continue thereafter.

Released in Australia, New Zealand, Europe, and the US, the album was warmly received. In Australia, it peaked at No. 19, and it also appeared on the U.S. Billboard 200. A promotional tour started in April 1986, with concerts both at home and abroad. Unexpectedly, Willson-Piper suddenly quit mid-tour after rising in-band tensions and on 10 July, The Church performed as a three-piece in Hamburg, Germany. Willson-Piper returned within a week after Kilbey agreed that future releases would contain more group efforts.

Despite the charged atmosphere and warm press, low sales for the album's singles in Australia prompted EMI to drop them. Plans for a double live album, Bootleg, were also scrapped. Since the band had greater sales overseas than in Australia, they decided to record in a studio abroad and opted for a four-album deal with U.S. label Arista Records in 1987. For Australian releases they signed with Mushroom Records.

Recording sessions in Los Angeles, with producers Waddy Wachtel (Bob Dylan, Rolling Stones, Robbie Williams) and Greg Ladanyi (Warren Zevon, Jackson Browne, Fleetwood Mac), were a new challenge according to Kilbey: "It was Australian hippies versus West Coast guys who know the way they like to do things. We were a bit more undisciplined than they would have liked". Personality clashes occurred as the two sides bickered over guitar sounds, song structures, and work ethic. Under pressure from the producers, Kilbey took vocal lessons, an experience he later regarded as valuable.

The stress of living in the US influenced their recording, and left Kilbey feeling out of place:  Album tracks such as "North, South, East and West," "Lost," "Reptile", and "Destination" bore the imprint of the faces, scenery, and daily life of the group's new, temporary home.

Four weeks of gruelling rehearsals resulted in Starfish, which focused on capturing the band's core sound. Bright, spacious, and uncluttered, the recording was a departure from the layered orchestrations of Heyday. The group wanted as live and dynamic an album as possible; Willson-Piper said that trying to record a live atmosphere lacked a real gig's sense of "being there". They found the results bare and simplistic; however, the public reception was unexpected.

Released in April 1988, Starfish found its way into the mainstream, marking a new worldwide commercial peak for the band. It reached No. 11 in Australia and the Top 50 in the US. The album was awarded a gold record in December 1992 by the Recording Industry Association of America. Also released in February, the single "Under the Milky Way" reached #24 on the US Hot 100, #22 in Australia, and entered the Canadian Top 100. It peaked at No. 2 on the Billboard Mainstream Rock Tracks. The song was written by Kilbey and then-girlfriend Karin Jansson (ex-Pink Champagne). A near five-minute video received airtime on music television programs. "Under the Milky Way" won an ARIA Award in 1989 for 'Single of the Year'. In 2008, readers of The Australian voted it the best Australian song of the last 20 years. In response, Kilbey said, "it's not really about anything at all. I just wanted to create an atmosphere and I didn't even put a lot of thought into that. History has given it something that it never really had".

A second single from Starfish, "Reptile", charted on the Australian Top 100 in August and Billboard Mainstream charts.

EMI responded with a double compilation album, Hindsight 1980-1987, which contained selections from the band's prior albums, together with hitherto-uncollected singles and B-sides. It peaked in the ARIA Top 40 Albums Chart in July.

1989–1992: Gold Afternoon Fix, Priest=Aura
The Church promoted Starfish with a nine-month tour before they returned to the studio for a follow-up. With a US Top 50 album under their belt, there was pressure from Arista to create another. The band started negotiations with former Led Zeppelin bass guitarist and keyboardist John Paul Jones, who had a reputation as a sophisticated producer, but the record company and management vetoed their suggestion. In an attempt to duplicate the success of Starfish, The Church returned to Los Angeles, with Waddy Wachtel producing.

While the prior sessions were tense, these were volatile. Already unenthusiastic about the forced pairing, there was the stress of having to create another hit album, and this took its toll. All members were outspoken about the role that drugs played in The Church’s creative process, but drummer Richard Ploog began to retreat further into his own habit as pressure increased. The number of attempted studio takes spiralled and Ploog's relationship with Kilbey deteriorated, accentuated by Wachtel's demands for a consistently reliable tempo. Eventually, Ploog's isolation led to exclusion and his drum tracks were replaced by rigid, but meter-perfect, programmed drums on all but three tracks. He left the band after the sessions.

The resulting album, Gold Afternoon Fix, while different from its predecessor, reached No.12 on the Australian Recording Industry Association (ARIA) Albums Chart. While Starfish focused on a raw, live sound, Gold Afternoon Fix employed more ambient aspects including piano, acoustic guitars, and keyboards. On some tracks, the music was punctuated by clanging metal, rustling wind, or sharp, industrial sounds.

Gold Afternoon Fix was heavily backed by a promotional campaign from Arista and the band went on tour, hiring Patti Smith's drummer Jay Dee Daugherty. The album spawned a hit single, "Metropolis" (No. 19 in Australia, No. 11 on U.S. Mainstream Rock), but the follow-up, "You're Still Beautiful", did not chart. Ultimately, the album's sales were lower than Starfish'''s and press was mixed. The band, particularly Kilbey, would later dismiss the album as "lousy", "hashed together", and "hideous", although many of the songs have since become fixtures in the band's setlists.

After the dust had settled on Gold Afternoon Fix, The Church returned to their old haunt at Sydney's Studios 301 to commence work on their next album. With lowered commercial expectations and less pressure from Arista, the atmosphere was more relaxed. Bringing in British producer Gavin MacKillop (Barenaked Ladies, Toad the Wet Sprocket, Straitjacket Fits) to supervise the sessions, the band began to improvise the framework for the next set of songs. The use of opium and, for Kilbey, heroin, saw the material take on a more expansive and surreal quality, while Daugherty's jazzier approach on drums was a fresh change.Priest=Aura, titled from Kilbey's misreading of a Spanish fan's English vocabulary notes ('priest' = 'cura'), contains fourteen songs, many over six minutes long, and was their longest album yet at 65 minutes. With song concepts derived from cryptic, one-word working titles (an idea originally proposed by Willson-Piper), the lyrics leaned towards the abstract and esoteric. Emphasizing free association and undirected coincidence between music and motif, Kilbey declined to define their meanings. Sonically, the music had numerous layers, courtesy of numerous guitar overdubs and MacKillop's rich production. The interplay between Koppes and Willson-Piper dominated throughout, especially on tracks such as "Ripple," "Kings," and the epic, aptly titled "Chaos", whose lyrics were a reflection of Steve Kilbey's unsettled lifestyle at the time.

Upon its release on 10 March 1992, Priest=Aura was given a mixed reception. It peaked in the ARIA Top 30, but reviews were varied, with some critical and others uncertain how to react. The band only went on a limited tour, confined to Australia, as Kilbey prepared for the birth of his twin daughters with Karin Jansson.

Adding to the decline in The Church's outlook was the announcement of Koppes' departure. His decision reflected two main factors: that the band had earned nothing for the two-week tour of Australia, and that he felt shut out of the creative process - a long-standing complaint that stretched back at least as far as Seance, if not further. Despite a completely sold-out tour, increasing personality conflicts within the band and frustration over their lack of success had made the situation intolerable. Despite its muted reception at the time of release, Priest=Aura is considered by both the band and fan base to be an artistic high point. In his 2014 autobiography, Something Quite Peculiar, Kilbey calls it their "undisputed masterpiece".

1993–1996: Sometime Anywhere, Magician Among the Spirits
Despite the loss of Koppes, Arista decided to stand by the band's contract and back another Church album, and so Kilbey and Willson-Piper began to write new material. When it became clear that Daugherty would not be returning to the fold either, the remaining two took the opportunity to approach their music from new perspectives, abandoning their long-established roles and stylistic elements in favour of experimentation, spontaneity, and electronica.

Early in 1994, the two brought in Willson-Piper's childhood friend Andy 'Dare' Mason to produce, record, and mix. The album was mostly recorded at Sydney's Karmic Hit Studios and mixed at Karmic Hit and Studios 301. New Zealand drummer Tim Powles (ex-The Venetians) was hired for the sessions, having already played with Kilbey on his Jack Frost project. Considered temporary at the time, Powles would soon become a permanent member of the band and is still with them over 20 years later.

The resulting album, Sometime Anywhere, released in May 1994, was generally well received and peaked in the Top 30. It is described as a "rich, dark, epic release [which] picked up where Priest left off with lush, lengthy tracks". Sales, however, were paltry and the first single, "Two Places at Once", did not chart. Promotion was minimal as Arista saw insufficient commercial promise in the release. With another commercially unsuccessful album on their hands, Arista did not renew The Church's contract and pulled financial support for a tour. Ambitious plans to stage full electric shows were scaled back, leaving Kilbey and Willson-Piper with only a short run of acoustic gigs as a duo.

Without a recording deal, the band's future looked bleak as Kilbey and Willson-Piper began work on new recordings in 1995. Although initially a two-man project, the new material saw input from new drummer Powles and hired violinist Linda Neil. Renewed contact between Kilbey and Peter Koppes led to the latter agreeing to guest on four songs - a welcome surprise for fans. Simon Polinski (Yothu Yindi) was drafted in to co-produce, engineer, and mix the sessions. The music saw a return to guitar-based material, infused with krautrock and art rock influences. A 15-minute atmospheric piece called "Magician Among the Spirits" dominated the sessions, named after a book by Harry Houdini. Additional contributions by Utungun Percussion added a new, primal aspect to several songs.

The album, also called Magician Among the Spirits, received mixed reviews, despite the guitar rock hook of its single "Comedown". It was released on the band's own Deep Karma label, but due to financial constraints, they had to arrange outside distribution for the North American and European markets. This almost doomed the album from the beginning, but worse events were to come. Within a short time, the U.S. distributor went bankrupt, leaving the band stripped of its earnings from North American sales. Although exact figures remain unknown due to disputes, up to A$250,000 worth of merchandise (some 25,000 discs) was lost. For a band already on shaky ground, this was nearly the death knell. Comments by Kilbey in May of that year summed up the situation: "There's no immediate future for The Church.....Our management, the whole thing is broken down.....We don't really have a label. We're owed lots and lots of money and we're broke. We're trying to pursue lawyers to get our money back. Marty and I aren't having any communication. There's no one really managing us so.....that could have been the last record."

1997–1999: The Refo:mation, Hologram of Baal, A Box of Birds
Following the commercial failure of Magician Among the Spirits, the members of The Church turned their attention to other projects and Willson-Piper left Australia again in order to collaborate with other artists and write new solo material. In his absence, Kilbey, Powles, and Koppes spent some studio time together and quickly wrote and recorded an album as The Refo:mation, utilizing Powles also as a mix engineer. Loose in feel but rich in atmosphere, the eccentrically-titled Pharmakoi/Distance-Crunching Honchos with Echo Units saw a greater focus on concise, guitar-dominated songs, in contrast to the experimentation of Magician Among the Spirits.

Group tensions within The Church proper were still simmering, however. More than anyone else, it was new drummer Tim Powles who tried to alleviate the outstanding disagreements. While Koppes and Willson-Piper had already had differences for some time, Kilbey and Willson-Piper's relationship was also strained by recent problems. Kilbey declared that the end was nigh: after a final, worthy swan song, with the working title Au Revoir Por Favor, the Church would be put to rest. The four agreed to play a string of farewell concerts around Australia, which turned out to be extremely successful. The roaring success of the intended "final concert" in Sydney put a quick end to talk of the band's demise.

The results of the new recording sessions saw a return to the band's roots: the material was once again based around Koppes and Willson-Piper's guitar interplay. Also, for the first time, the band completely produced the work themselves, under Powles' aegis. Originally given the name Bastard Universe, the forthcoming album was re-titled Hologram of Allah after Willson-Piper found the original too negative. Concerns about fundamentalist Muslim reaction to the potentially blasphemous title made the band finally opt for the more neutral Hologram of Baal, after the Canaanite god. Released under a new contract with UK independent label Cooking Vinyl, the album was distributed in the U.S. by Thirsty Ear. A limited edition featured a bonus disc with a nearly 80-minute continuous improvised instrumental, which received the original title of the album, Bastard Universe.

The reformed and rejuvenated band went on their first fully electric tour of the U.S., Australia, and Europe in many years. A plan to release a live album called Bag of Bones was put into motion, but then cancelled.

Instead, a collection of cover songs was recorded in Sweden, shedding light on the band's influences. Arriving in August 1999 - less than a year after Hologram of Baal - A Box of Birds contained an unusual selection of songs from Ultravox and Iggy Pop to The Monkees and Neil Young. The insert for the CD was designed as interchangeable, with 10 separate sleeve designs created by fans. As with Hologram of Baal, a tour followed the album's release, but new drama hit the band mid-tour in New York City when Kilbey was arrested for trying to purchase heroin. The band was forced to improvise a set after he failed to show, with Willson-Piper covering vocals. A night in jail and a day's community service on the Manhattan subway were Kilbey's only punishment. "A drug bust is something every aging rock star should have under his belt", he was later quoted as saying.

2000–2007: After Everything Now This, Forget Yourself, Uninvited, Like the Clouds
In 2001, "Under the Milky Way" was featured in the film Donnie Darko, helping to raise the band's profile once again. However, recording for their next album turned out to be painstakingly slow due to numerous side projects and simple geography. With Kilbey now living in Sweden, Willson-Piper in England, and the others in Australia, the bandmates met across several separate sessions. Partially recorded in Sweden, NYC, and Australia, the resulting After Everything Now This, released in January 2002, saw a focus on the softer elements of the band, with responsibility for production and final mixing again resting on Powles. With only three obvious "rock" tracks out of ten, gentler moods dominated. The album achieved the biggest international success for The Church in almost ten years. The successive world tour featured the band in a more subtle setting as well, with most tracks performed primarily acoustically alongside guest David Lane on piano.

Fans would not have to wait long for another group release.  The double-disc remix/outtakes set Parallel Universe hit stores in late 2002. Unique among the band's catalogue, the first disc, subtitled "remixture", featured a reshuffled, remixed, electronic version of the After Everything Now This album, the result of Tim Powles' collaboration with Sydney EDM musicians. The second disc, subtitled "mixture", compiled leftover songs from the After Everything Now This recording sessions.

Around the time that Parallel Universe was released, the Church had returned to the studio to record yet another album, eventually titled Forget Yourself. Rather than fleshing the songs out over a long, gradual process, the band decided to keep the music as close to the original jam-based material as possible. Stylistically, this made for a much rawer sound, primarily recorded live and with minimal overdubs. As had become routine since Sometime Anywhere, songs saw numerous instrument changes between members, with Powles playing lead guitar on "Sealine","Maya", and "Reversal", and Willson-Piper switching to drums on "Maya". Forget Yourself was engineered and co-produced by Nic Hard and was released in Australia in October 2003 and in the U.S. in February 2004. The band toured extensively to support the album in Australia, the U.S., and Europe.

Their prolific output continued into 2004 with the release of three ancillary albums. Under the guidance of manager Kevin Lane Keller - an American fan and marketing professor who had been working with the band since 2001 - the Church began capitalizing on the advantages offered by the internet and the independent music industry. First, in August, came the entirely improvised album Jammed, containing just two long tracks and available exclusively from the band's website. Next, in October, came their third outtakes album, Beside Yourself, covering the Forget Yourself sessions. Finally, only six weeks later, came El Momento Descuidado, in which the band presented old and new material in an acoustic setting, for the Liberation Blue label. The title was a rough tongue-in-cheek translation of "The Unguarded Moment", a version of which was included. A short acoustic tour followed in late 2004, which initiated a new practice amongst the band members: that of swapping instruments on stage. The album was eventually nominated in 2005 for "Best Adult Contemporary Album" at the Australian ARIA Music Awards, although it did not win.

In 2005, The Church returned to full electric mode and began work on new material once again. The first release from these sessions was the outtakes album Back with Two Beasts, released via their website as a teaser for the main album which would follow a few months later. Back with Two Beasts has over time come to have a "main" album life of its own, with tracks being featured on Apple music and the like, being seen by many fans as the band at its fluid and fresh artistic best. Uninvited, Like the Clouds, their 20th studio album, was released to rapturous reviews in April 2006 and was followed once again by extensive touring in Europe, the U.S., and Australia. Just before its release, in March, they performed "Under the Milky Way" with the Melbourne Symphony Orchestra as part of the 2006 Commonwealth Games opening ceremony.

In February 2007 came El Momento Siguiente, a second album of acoustic re-interpretations of earlier songs plus several new compositions and a cover version of the Triffids classic "Wide Open Road". Later that year, the band toured Australia with the Pretenders, and EMI released the double-CD collection Deep in the Shallows – The Classic Singles Collection.

2008–2011: Shriek, Untitled #23, ARIA Hall of Fame induction, 30th anniversary
In 2006, The Church had embarked on their third improvised music project: to provide the soundtrack for a short film based on the renowned American science fiction writer Jeff Vandermeer's novel Shriek: An Afterword. The music was released in 2008 as the album Shriek: Excerpts from the Soundtrack, and was the first release on their new label, Unorthodox Records, a partnership with MGM Distribution.

In February 2009, the band began the build-up to their next major studio album with the Coffee Hounds EP, which featured the original, non-album composition "The Coffee Song", and a cover of Kate Bush's classic "Hounds of Love". The following month they released the Pangaea EP, whose title track would also be on the upcoming album.

Unorthodox Records released the album Untitled#23 in Australia in March and the U.S. label Second Motion Records released it to the rest of the world shortly thereafter. Recorded at Powles' Spacejunk III Studios by engineer/artist Jorden Brebach, who mixed many of the tracks, a double vinyl version quickly sold out. It was the band's 23rd album-length Australian release of original studio material, while Kilbey also alluded to the mystical significance of the number 23 in an interview with music publication Music Feeds. Another major international tour followed, the "So Love May Find Us" tour, named after a non-album track from the Pangaea EP.

Coinciding with the tour, a book entitled No Certainty Attached: Steve Kilbey and The Church by Robert Dean Lurie was published in Australia, the US, and the UK by Verse Chorus Press. While primarily a biography of Kilbey, the book also traced the evolution of the band from his perspective. This was not an official band project but Kilbey, Koppes, and various friends and family members did participate.

On 27 November 2009, the Church released another EP, Operetta. The title track was taken from Untitled #23 but the remaining tracks, including the 34-minute improvisation "Particles Matter", were unique to this release.

In February 2010, the band announced that they would be celebrating their thirtieth anniversary with an acoustic tour entitled "An Intimate Space". In a unique programme, the band chose one song from each of their many albums and performed them in reverse chronological order. The shows included a 28-page program and the Deadman's Hand EP, which included more unreleased material from the Untitled #23 sessions and some tracks specifically shaped by Powles for the release. The US leg of the tour spanned April and May, including a performance of "Under the Milky Way" on KUSI News in San Diego.

In October, Second Motion Records re-released six early Church albums in the US, with bonus tracks and extensive liner notes by Willson-Piper, along with the Deep in the Shallows singles collection.

On 27 October 2010, the Church were inducted into the Australian Recording Industry Association Hall of Fame by media commentator George Negus, while young pop singer Washington performed "The Unguarded Moment". After their acceptance speech, the band performed "Under the Milky Way" and "Tantalized". In November and December, they continued with the Australian leg of their "An Intimate Space" tour.

The band travelled to the US once again in February 2011 in full electric mode for the "Future Past Perfect" tour, performing three albums in their entirety: Untitled#23, Priest=Aura, and Starfish. Sold-out dates were played in Los Angeles, San Francisco, Seattle, Chicago, Alexandria, Philadelphia, New York, Foxborough, and Atlanta. This tour was the first on which the band was augmented onstage by the Australian multi-instrumentalist Craig Wilson, from the band ASTREETLIGHTSONG.

On 10 April 2010, The Church further celebrated their 30th anniversary with a special show entitled "A Psychedelic Symphony" at the Sydney Opera House, which had been a year in preparation. Accompanied by conductor George Ellis and the George Ellis Symphony Orchestra, the concert was performed to a sold-out 2,000+ capacity crowd and was recorded and filmed. A DVD and double CD were released by Unorthodox in June 2014, the band's first official live album. The show was also broadcast on the Australian music TV channel MAX during October 2011.

In December 2010, they concluded the "Future Past Perfect" tour with a dozen Australian dates. Their show of 17 December at the Enmore Theatre, Sydney, was filmed and is available to stream online.

2012 onward: Royalty dispute, Willson-Piper's departure, Further/Deeper, Man Woman Life Death Infinity, Koppes' departure
In November and December 2012, The Church played a major series of concerts across Australia and New Zealand, together with Simple Minds, Devo, and Models. As part of the tour, they also played several "A Day on the Green" events with Models. During this tour, they also played two intimate "Art Rock 'n' Roll" shows, one at the Corner Hotel in Melbourne and the other at the Factory Theatre in Sydney, where each member chose four songs from the band's catalogue, interspersed with a selection of concert staples.

In March 2013, there were the outward signs of internal problems in the band when Steve Kilbey issued a series of statements which indicated that he was considering leaving The Church due to a dispute over royalty payments. Then, later in the year, Kilbey announced on the band's Facebook page that Marty Willson-Piper would not be returning and had been replaced by former Powderfinger guitarist Ian Haug. Kilbey explained that Willson-Piper was "not available" for the recording of a new album and subsequent touring, and praised Haug as "a brilliant guitarist". Kilbey also provided a pre-emptive response to disgruntled fans: "... if you can't dig it I'm sorry. this is my fucking band after all and it has existed at times without Peter and in the beginning without Marty."

In early October 2014, Kilbey explained that Willson-Piper was not asked to leave the band but that he had simply not replied to the various attempts made to contact him. Realizing that Willson-Piper would not respond, and in agreement with Powles at the time, Kilbey said "Yes, we have to find someone with stature. He has to have his own trip, he can’t be some weedy little guy coming in to play guitar. It has to be somebody with experience and gravitas." As part of the same interview, Haug explained that he had received a phone call from Kilbey while he was returning home from a funeral. Without first greeting Haug, Kilbey simply asked, "If I asked you to join The Church, what would you say?" and ended the call after Haug's affirmative, but bewildered, response. Haug said that joining the Church was the "last thing" that would have entered his mind, but that "it just really seemed to work".

Entitled Further/Deeper, the Church's 24th studio album was released on 17 October 2014. Recorded over a period of eight days in late 2013, Further/Deeper was produced and engineered by Powles. Writing for the Courier-Mail, Noel Mengel rated the album with 4.5 stars, while Jeff Apter assigned the album 4 stars in Rolling Stone Australia. The band performed the album in its entirety during the "Further/Deeper" tours of Australia, then headed to North America and Europe, with a guest spot and select shows at SXSW Festival in Austin, Texas, and then a career-defining set on one of the prestigious PrimaVera festival's main stages in Barcelona, Spain.

In July, August, and September 2015, the band toured Australia, finishing at Splendour in the Grass festival, and then going to the U.S. again, co-headlining with The Psychedelic Furs on most of these dates. On this tour, at select headline side shows, the band played most of Further/Deeper plus The Blurred Crusade in their entirety. Upon arriving back in Australia, they headlined the boutique Small World Festival in Sydney's Newtown neighbourhood.

In 2016, the band returned to the U.S. again twice, first for a more comprehensive headline tour playing The Blurred Crusade in its entirety and including an invite to the main stage with The Flaming Lips and Young Fathers at Mavericks Festival in San Antonio, Texas. Then, in July, they toured the US again, repeating the success of 2015 by once again sharing larger venues with The Psychedelic Furs.

2017 brought the recording and release of The Church's 25th album, Man Woman Life Death Infinity. It was released on 6 October and was preceded by two singles, the album opener "Another Century" and the fourth track, "Undersea". About the album, Steve Kilbey commented, "This is The Church's water record. I've always marveled at the seas, rivers, and rain. It wasn't conscious at all, but on reflection, it definitely is a preoccupation on this record." The band toured North America in September and October before returning home to Australia for a string of dates in November and December.

On 1 February 2020, Steve Kilbey announced on Facebook that Peter Koppes had departed the group, and that touring member Jeffrey Cain had been promoted to full member status, with Even guitarist Ashley Naylor also being brought into the lineup.

Also in early 2020, their official webpage has them working on a new album tentatively titled In the Wake of the Zeitgeist.

Members
Current members
 Steve Kilbey – lead vocals, bass, keyboards, guitar (1980–present)
 Tim Powles – drums, percussion, backing vocals, guitar (1994–present)
 Ian Haug – guitar, backing vocals (2013–present)
 Jeffrey Cain – guitar, bass, keyboards, backing vocals (2020–present; touring 2017–2019)
 Ashley Naylor – guitar (2020–present)

Current touring musicians
 Nicholas Meredith – percussion, drums (2022–present)

Former members
 Peter Koppes – guitar, keyboards, backing vocals (1980–1992, 1997–2019)
 Nick Ward – drums, percussion, backing vocals (1980–1981)
 Marty Willson-Piper – guitar, backing vocals, bass (1980–2013)
 Richard Ploog – drums, percussion (1981–1990)
 Jay Dee Daugherty – drums, percussion (1990–1993)

Former touring musicians
 Craig Wilson – guitar, bass, keyboards, backing vocals (2009-2017, 2021)

Timeline

Discography

 Of Skins and Heart (1981) released internationally as The Church in 1982 with variant tracks
 The Blurred Crusade (1982)
 Seance (1983)
 Heyday (1985)
 Starfish (1988)
 Gold Afternoon Fix (1990)
 Priest=Aura (1992)
 Sometime Anywhere (1994)
 Magician Among the Spirits (1996)
 Hologram of Baal (1998)
 After Everything Now This (2002)
 Forget Yourself (2003)
 Jammed (2004)
 Uninvited, Like the Clouds (2006)
 Untitled #23 (2009)
 Further/Deeper (2014)
 Man Woman Life Death Infinity (2017)
 The Hypnogogue (2023)

Awards and nominations
ARIA Music Awards
The ARIA Music Awards is an annual ceremony presented by Australian Recording Industry Association (ARIA), which recognise excellence, innovation, and achievement across all genres of the music of Australia. They commenced in 1987.

! 
|-
| rowspan="2"| 1989|| rowspan="2"| "Under the Milky Way" || ARIA Award for Single of the Year ||  || 
|-
| ARIA Award for Song of the Year ||  || 
|-
| 2005 || El Momento Descuidado || ARIA Award for Best Adult Contemporary Album ||  || 
|-
| 2010 || The Church || ARIA Hall of Fame ||  || 

Helpmann Awards
The Helpmann Awards is a ceremony celebrating live entertainment and performing arts in Australia, presented by the industry group Live Performance Australia since 2001. Note: 2020 and 2021 were cancelled due to the COVID-19 pandemic.
 

! 
|-
| 2011
| "A Psychedelic Symphony" – 30th Anniversary Concert ''
| Helpmann Award for Best Australian Contemporary Concert
| 
| 
|-

References

General
 
 
 
  Note: Archived [on-line] copy has limited functionality.
 
Specific

External links

 
 

 
ARIA Award winners
ARIA Hall of Fame inductees
Musical groups from Sydney
Australian rock music groups
Australian post-punk groups
Australian new wave musical groups
Parlophone artists
Musical groups established in 1980
Australian alternative rock groups
Neo-psychedelia groups
Dream pop musical groups
Cooking Vinyl artists
Thirsty Ear Recordings artists
Mushroom Records artists
Carrere Records artists
Second Motion Records artists